Ghulam Mohammad Grami was born on 30 December 1920 in Mehar, Dadu District, Sindh. He belonged with the Laghari Baloch tribe of the Sindh. He was a scholar, journalist and poet. He died on 15 September 1976.

Early life
He learned Sindhi, Persian, Urdu and Arabic. In 1943 he traveled to Hyderabad, Sindh in Jamia Arabia Tahreek and stayed in Hyderabad.

Professional career
Grami was appointed in a  training college for men as a Persian teacher. He was affiliated with daily Hilal E Pakistan and Ibrat newspapers. He also held the post of editor of Aftab Karachi, which is a newspaper in the Sindhi language, Irfan-e-letif (Hyderabad), Pasban (Hala), Alzaman (Hala), Tarjuman (Mirpur Khas). In 1955 he became Managing Editor of Mehran Magazine and held the seat for all of his life. He published the poetry and writings of new writers. He collected literature for Mehran. He used to sit in Cafe George in Hyderabad and would edit the articles and write ups of the literary figures.

Publications
Grami wrote books on different subjects. Such as Allah Jo Wajud (1953), Waya se Weenjhar (1977), ( Rafeeq-e-Hayat (1957), Kuliyat-e-Bulbul (1969), Asan jo Piyaro Deen(1971) Deeniyat for class VIII etc. Mohammad Shah Rashdi said about him: “The language that has such pen, shall never die”. He wrote on religion, mysticism, philosophy, politics, literature, history and poetry.

Death
Ghulam Mohammad Grami died on 15 September 1976.

References

Pakistani poets
Sindhi-language poets
 Scholars from Sindh
Sindhi people
1920 births
1976 deaths